Tribsoft was a Canadian software company that specialized in porting computer games to the Linux platform.

It was responsible for porting Jagged Alliance 2, as well as gaining the porting rights to Europa Universalis, Majesty: The Fantasy Kingdom Sim and Jagged Alliance 2: Unfinished Business. In the end only Majesty was ever ported and that was done by Linux Game Publishing. Europa Universalis II was also said to be coming to Linux.

Sometime in 2002 the owner of Tribsoft mentioned that he was "taking a short break" from porting games to Linux. This break eventually became permanent, when Tribsoft shut down in late 2002.

See also
Hyperion Entertainment
Linux Game Publishing
Loki Software

References

External links
Tribsoft Website (Internet Archive, Jan 22, 2002)
Tribsoft at LinuxGames
Gamespy - Tribsoft Linux Ports
Linux Journal Review of Jagged Alliance 2
Review: Jagged Alliance 2 for Linux

Software companies disestablished in 2002
Defunct video game companies of Canada
Linux companies
Linux game porters